The Last Temptation is the thirteenth solo studio album by American rock singer Alice Cooper, released on July 12, 1994, by Epic Records.  It centers on a boy named Steven (also the name of the protagonist in Cooper's earlier work, Welcome to My Nightmare), and a mysterious showman.  The showman, with apparent supernatural abilities, attempts with the use of twisted versions of morality plays to persuade Steven to join his traveling show, "The Theater of the Real - The Grand-est Guignol!", where he would "never grow up".

The album once again features collaborations with some high-profile guests: Chris Cornell of Soundgarden co-wrote and sings on two songs, Dan Wexler of Phoenix metallers Icon co-wrote four songs including the single "Lost in America" where he also plays guitar, and Derek Sherinian of Dream Theater plays keyboards.

Comic
The full story was given in a three-part comic book written by Neil Gaiman, the first part of which accompanied the recording.  In the comic, the showman (referred to only ever as such) was depicted as Cooper himself. Pages from the comic are seen in the Lost in America music video, while it is being read by Steven.

It was originally published by Marvel Comics and later reprinted by Dark Horse Comics, collected as trade paperback.

Video
Music videos were made for "Lost in America" and "It's Me". Both music videos are available for download from Sony/BMG.

Reception
Barry Weber of allmusic.com wrote, "By the time The Last Temptation was released in 1994, the hair band fad that had fueled Cooper's return was dead, and Cooper was obviously aware of its downfall – the album sounds almost nothing like its two predecessors (1989's Trash and 1991's Hey Stoopid). Far surpassing anything Cooper recorded in almost 20 years, The Last Temptation is unquestionably some of his best work."

Live performances
Although Epic did not finance a tour and Cooper consequently did not tour The Last Temptation, four of the album's songs – “It’s Me”, “Lost in America”, “Cleansed by Fire” and “Sideshow” – were incorporated into Cooper's setlist from the time of his first appearance on the Monsters of Rock circuit in September 1995. Although “It’s Me” was dropped after four performances, the other three songs remained a regular part of setlists until the end of the Life and Crimes of Alice Cooper tour in 1999, and were joined by “Nothing’s Free” on the “School’s Out for Summer ‘97” tour. However, with the exception of “Lost in America”, which has remained a frequent part of setlists excluding the first three quarters of the 2012 to 2015 “Raise the Dead” tour, nothing from The Last Temptation has been performed live from 2000 onwards.

Track listing

Personnel
Alice Cooper – vocals
Stef Burns – guitar, background vocals
Greg Smith – bass, background vocals
Derek Sherinian – keyboards, background vocals
David Uosikkinen – drums

Additional personnel
Chris Cornell – vocals on "Stolen Prayer" and "Unholy War"
Dan Wexler – guitar on "Lost In America"
John Purdell – keyboards on "You're My Temptation", "Lullaby" and "It's Me"
Lou Merlino – background vocals
Mark Hudson – background vocals
Craig Copeland – background vocals
Brett Hudson – background vocals

Charts

References

Alice Cooper albums
1994 albums
Albums with cover art by Dave McKean
Rock operas
Comics based on musical groups
Comics by Neil Gaiman
Epic Records albums
Concept albums
Albums produced by Duane Baron
Albums produced by John Purdell
Albums produced by Andy Wallace (producer)